Emma Sykes may refer to:

Emma Sykes (rugby union) (born 1998), Australian rugby union player 
Emma Belle Gibson Sykes (1885-1970), suffragist and civil rights activist